This is a recap of the 1989 season for the Professional Bowlers Association (PBA) Tour.  It was the tour's 31st season, and consisted of 36 events.

Despite winning four titles (including a major at the Seagram's Coolers U.S. Open) and setting a PBA record of $298,237 in season earnings, Mike Aulby was out-voted for PBA Player of the Year honors in favor of Amleto Monacelli. Monacelli also won four titles, including the Budweiser Touring Players Championship, while leading the Tour in points and finishing second in earnings.

Pete Weber completed the triple crown of PBA majors when he took the title in the Trustcorp PBA National Championship. He joined Johnny Petraglia and Billy Hardwick as the PBA's only career triple crown winners.

Del Ballard, Jr. captured his second career major title and fifth overall at the Firestone Tournament of Champions.

Tournament schedule

References

External links
1989 Season Schedule

Professional Bowlers Association seasons
1989 in bowling